Brandon Alex Graham Hanlan (born 31 May 1997) is an English professional footballer who plays as a forward for Wycombe Wanderers.

Career

Charlton Athletic
Hanlan joined the academy at Charlton Athletic in November 2012, and signed a two-year contract extension in April 2016. He made his first team debut as an 84th-minute substitute for Kevin Foley in a 2–0 defeat to Bury at Gigg Lane in a League One match on 6 August 2016.

On 31 August 2017, Hanlan joined Colchester United on loan until the middle of January 2018. He made his club debut as a substitute on 12 September and scored in the 1–1 draw with Chesterfield.

On 1 February 2018, Hanlan rejoined Bromley on loan until the end of the 2017/18 season.

He was released by Charlton at the end of the 2017–18 season.

Gillingham
On 2 June 2018, Hanlan signed for Gillingham on a two-year deal, and scored the club's first goal of the season on his full Gillingham debut in a 2–0 away win against Accrington Stanley. He was named as the club's Young Player of the Season at the end of his first season with the club.

Bristol Rovers
On 10 September 2020, Hanlan joined Bristol Rovers on a two-year deal. He made his debut two days later for the club in a 1-1 opening day draw away at Sunderland before being replaced due to injury in the second half. He scored his first goal for the club on 3 October 2020, grabbing the first in a 2-0 win over Northampton Town when he confidently smashed home a penalty after being fouled by Cian Bolger in the penalty area. On 20 October, Hanlan scored his third goal for the club, his first from open play, heading in a Zain Westbrooke free kick to score the only goal of the game in a victory over Shrewsbury Town. In July 2021, following a tribunal, it was determined that Bristol Rovers would pay a fee of £150k to Gillingham for the transfer of Hanlan from the previous summer. In August 2021, Hanlan was subject to a bid from League One side Lincoln City, rejected by Bristol Rovers as the fee offered was less than the sum the club had recently paid following the outcome of the tribunal. Rovers' manager Joey Barton spoke of his desire to keep the striker at the club however admitted that the striker had his head turned by the offer and was now wanting to leave the club.

Wycombe Wanderers
On 26 August 2021, Hanlan returned to League One to join Wycombe Wanderers for an undisclosed fee. He made his debut for Wycombe in the EFL Trophy against Aston Villa under 21's as a substitute on 31 August 2021. On 21 September, Hanlan scored his first goal for the club, Wycombe's only goal in a 6-1 defeat to Manchester City in the EFL Cup. After scoring another in the EFL Trophy defeat to Milton Keynes Dons, Hanlan's first league goal for the Chairboys came in a 2-0 win over former side Gillingham.

Career Statistics

Honours

Club 
Bromley
FA Trophy runner-up: 2017–18

Individual 

 Gillingham: Young Player of the Season: 2018–19

References

1997 births
Living people
Footballers from Chelsea, London
English footballers
Black British sportspeople
Association football forwards
Charlton Athletic F.C. players
Bromley F.C. players
Colchester United F.C. players
Gillingham F.C. players
Bristol Rovers F.C. players
Wycombe Wanderers F.C. players
English Football League players
National League (English football) players